The Singapore Po Leung Kuk was an institution in Singapore for women and girls who were victims of forced prostitution. The Po Leung Kok was established by the Chinese Protectorate in 1888, after a similar institution, Po Leung Kuk was founded in Hong Kong in 1878.

History 
It began as a single room with six beds and was meant for permanent juvenile residents. This was expanded to 120 beds in 1896, with new accommodation in 1928 providing for 300 residents. Beginning in 1931, accommodation was provided for in the Mental Hospital for 'moral imbeciles and feeble-minded girls' unsuitable for accommodation in a Po Leung Kuk Home. 

During the British Military Administration, the Po Leung Kuk Welfare Home in Singapore was turned into a training school to reform girls who had fallen or been coerced into prostitution during the war.

References

See also
Po Leung Kuk (Hong Kong)
Penang Po Leung Kuk
Kuala Lumpur Po Leung Kuk

Po Leung Kuk
Po Leung Kuk
1888 establishments in Singapore